Tonj, located in Warrap State, Bahr el Ghazal in South Sudan, is a historically rich and unique town. It is known by various names, including Kalkuel, Genanyuon, Jurkatac, Madiera, BaburWasaka, Genngeu, and Tonjdit. The town is bordered by Rumbek, Cueibet, Yambio, Bentiu, and Gokrial.

History and Economy 
Tonj has played an important role in the history of South Sudan, particularly during the colonial period. During the Second World War, Tonj served as an essential economic strength for the British Empire in Africa. The British government built the first colonial school in Southern Sudan, called Princes School, in Tonj in 1944 as a gift to the Jur river chiefs who contributed smoked meat for ally forces during the war in North Africa. This school was headed by Eric Daniel, also known as Makerdit. Additionally, Tonj District was reported to have provided significant support to the British Empire through food logistics. Thousands of bulls and cows were collected from the area to be sent to the war front.

In 1912, Tonj and Gogrial were under the jurisdiction of the Jur River during the colonial period of British rule. The capital was in Gogrial, but prior to that, Tonj had a more favorable climate for human life than Gogrial. In 1922, the British government shifted the capital to Kalkuel, which became the capital of the Jur River. Tonj is one of the largest towns in Warrap and the oldest town in South Sudan, home to various tribes such as Dinka, Bongo, and JurChol. The town is divided into three counties - Tonj North, Tonj South, and Tonj East - and has undergone further subdivisions.

Tonj has produced many leaders during the colonial period and after the independence of Sudan and South Sudan, such as William Deng Nhial, Dr. John Garang De Mabior, and Omer Hassien Bashir, who have studied in some of the schools in the town. The town is also ranked as one of the oldest and most historical cities in South Sudan, with a rich and positive history during the South Sudan war of liberation.

An influential politician from Tonj District, Veteran William Deng Nhial, was among the first ideological South Sudanese intellectuals to have spearheaded and struggled for the right of South Sudan's freedom. In 1996, when the Arab-based government wanted to create a state for Gogrial and Tonj Communities, they called it Warrap State. Warrap town is another small urban center within Tonj Region, and the capital was to be located in Warrap.

Tonj Region has a rich history, including being a very large constituency out of which Gogrial emerged, and Abyei Region before 1905 was part of its administration. In the early and late 1990s, the SPLM/A movement fighting the Khartoum regime was in the Tonj Region, around the areas of Thiet, Yinhkuel, Ngabagook, and Mayom Abun. Tonj and Rumbek were used during the war as logistics centers in the fight against the Arabs.

Dinka (Muonyjang) communities across South Sudan are well-versed with Wanhalel Dinka Customary Laws (Ganuun Wanhalel); all those laws that are now used to govern Dinka Communities were first drafted and formulated in Wanhalel, Tonj South.

Economically Kalkuel is a very rich region. It has plenty of oil underground waiting to be exploited for the benefit of the general South Sudanese and most of the swampy areas fall within this region between them and Unity State. Toich areas extend from the Konggor area, Lou Ariik, Apuk Padoc, Lou Paher, Thony Amoun Marol, and Luanyjang swampy areas. They are very rich in resources and if well-used the region shall quickly get developed. Tuony also keeps a lot of cattle and is so proud of their animals.

Population
In 2010, it was estimated that the population of Tonj, South Sudan, was approximately 17,340.

Political Participation

When war broke out in 2013 Tonj sons and daughters did not aim guns against their fellow South Sudanese and in fact very strongly the people of Tonj just like most South Sudanese participated in bringing peace back to South Sudan and defended the constitution and the sovereignty.
Tonj has some of the most influential politicians and military generals in South Sudan.

1. Mayiik Ayii Deng

2. Awut Deng Acuil

3. Nhial Deng Nhial
 
4. Akol Koor Kuc
 
5. Gen. Alieu Ayieny Alieu

6. Gen. Bol Akot Bol

7. Magok Magok

Notable People that have affiliated with Tonj

John Lee Tae-seok
South Korean Fr. John Lee Tae-seok worked as a Catholic missionary, priest, doctor, teacher and mentor to the people of Tonj. He worked at the leper colony. Lee Tae-seok was responsible for the introduction of a school, the Don Bosco hospital as well as forming the nation's first brass band which brought fame to the town. In memory of Lee Tae-seok, who died of cancer in 2010, the Korean TV network KBS and the South Sudanese government are working on a joint project called “Smile, Tonj” to rebuild Tonj.

Emmanuel Jal 
Musician, actor and activist Emanuel Jal was born in Tonj.

James Thuch Madhier 
Humanitarian James Thuch Madhier was born in Tonj.

Thomas Taban Akot 
Medical Doctor, Thomas Taban Akot.

Education
Tonj has continued to send its children to schools but still face limited access to education, especially in the rural areas. Tonj notable schools include Don Bosco Primary and Secondary Schools, Bakhita Primmary and Secondary Schools, Makerdit Primary school, among others. With few of its children that have gone to school, Tonj students have gone on to achieve amazing things in their education jounery. Some of the few Tonj students that shocked South Sudan and East Africa, include:

Tito Yak Kuol
shocked Kenya in both Kenyan Primary and Secondary Leaving Examinations. Tito Yak attended Harvard College, making him the first south Sudanese to have gone to Harvard College 

Emmanuel Malou Deng
shocked South Sudanese in his unparalleled performance in the South Sudan Secondary National examinations by being the fifth best student countrywide. Emmanuel has gone on to attend Columbia College (New York).

Mary Nyanbul Gum
shocked both Sudanese, South Sudanese, and Tuony by being the first female South Sudanese to occupied the second position in the entire Sudan in 2013 Sudan School Certificate of Secondary Education. Nyanbul went on to attend Brown University and graduated College in 2020. 

Albino Akol Atem
also made a record in the Sudan School Certificate of Secondary Education by being the tenth best in the entire Sudan. He has gone to study at University of Juba, a premier University in South Sudan.

And there are many other Tonj Students who have continued to make their mark in the education of South Sudan and abroad.

Transport
Three main roads lead out of Tonj:
 A43-North leads northwest to Wau, South Sudan
 A43-South leads southeast to Rumbek
 A smaller road leads directly north to merge with the Yirol-Yoynyang Road at Thar Jath
 The town is also served by Tonj Airport

Subsections of Tonj 
The Communities in Tonj are divided into the chieftainships. These chieftainships include the following:

Tonj East 
1. Luanyjang Aguer Adel

2. Akook Tek

3. Thiik Makom Majook

4. Luanykoth Bol Malek

5. Ador

6. Kongor Akucbeny

Tonj South 
1. Bongo

2. Muok Akot Wut

3. Yar Ayiei Cikom

4. Thony Amoun Marol or Thony Akol Aduol

5. Apuk Jurwiir

6. Malual Karthiith

Tonj North 
1. Lou Ariik

2. Apuk Padoc

3. Konggor Arop Akol

4. Awan Parek

5. Lou Paher

6. Jur Mananger

7. Noi Ayii Kuot

8. Atok Buk

9. Abiem Mayar Mareng

10. Abuok Ayom

11. Leer Mayom Aken

12. Nyang Akoc Majok

See also 
 Tonj Airport
 Warrap (state)
 Bahr el Ghazal

References

https://www.kenyans.co.ke/news/69360-kenyan-refugee-camp-harvard-university-story-tito-kuol
https://www.eyeradio.org/secondary-school-2018-2019-results-top-10-states-students/
https://www.bridge2rwanda.org/news/all-24-group-10-b2r-scholars-receive-international-scholarships-to-study-abroad/ ==External links==
Location of Tonj, South Sudan At Google Maps

Populated places in Warrap (state)
Bahr el Ghazal